Buddhist Ladies' College is a private girls' primary and secondary school in Colombo, Sri Lanka. The school was established by Mohandas De Mel on May 20, 1954. It is one of the leading government-approved schools in Colombo. The first principal of the school was Clara Motwani. The current principal is Padmaseeli Lyanage.

History
The Buddhist Ladies' College is a popular school situated in Town Hall, Kurunduwatta, Colombo. It was first established as a private school before being transferred to the government. It became a private Buddhist girls' school in 2018. The school's motto is: The Utmost for the Highest. It was previously part of the same school as Vishaka College, but the schools were later separated.

Achievements
Buddhist Ladies' College was the first school whose students used to jump through a fire ring at the gymnastics display. 

The Buddhist Ladies' College choir achieved All Island first place in a competition in 2017 (open category), and successfully advanced to the semifinals of the Ananda College Vocalize generation five competitions in 2019.

Alumni

References

External links

1954 establishments in Ceylon
Buddhist schools in Sri Lanka
Educational institutions established in 1954
Girls' schools in Sri Lanka
Private schools in Sri Lanka
Schools in Colombo